Riolo is a surname of Italian origin. It may refer to:

People
Alessandro Riolo (b. 1978), Italian footballer
David Riolo (b. 1972), Australian former rugby league footballer
Vince Riolo (b. 1947), Maltese philosopher
Vincenzo Riolo (1772–1837), Italian painter
Vanni Riolo (b.1935)
Maltese actor and former educator
Ivan Riolo (b.1968)
University of Malta lecturer and Maltese basketball player

Places
Riolo Terme, an Italian municipality of the Province of Ravenna, Emilia-Romagna
Riolos, a Greek village of West Achaea municipality, West Greece
Pattiro Riolo, an Indonesian village in Sibulue district, Bone Regency, South Sulawesi

See also
Riol, a German municipality in Rhineland-Palatinate
Riola, a Spanish municipality in Valencian Community
Rioli, a surname

Italian-language surnames